Parliamentary elections were held in Latvia on 7 and 8 October 1922. The Latvian Social Democratic Workers' Party remained the largest party, winning 30 of the 100 seats.

Electoral system
For the elections the country was divided into five constituencies, electing a total of 97 MPs using proportional representation. The three remaining seats were awarded to the parties with the highest vote totals that had failed to win a seat in any of the five constituencies.

The list system used was made flexible, as voters were able to cross out candidates' names and replace them with names from other lists. However, only 19.97% of voters made any changes to the lists. To register a list for the election parties needed only collect 100 signatures. A total of 88 lists registered, but only 43 contested the election. There was no voter roll, but instead passports were used to identify voters.

Results

References

External links
Detailed results

Latvia
Parliamentary
Parliamentary elections in Latvia
Latvia